KPRG (89.3 FM) is Guam's only public radio station. The station is owned and operated by the Guam Educational Radio Foundation and is licensed to Hagåtña. The station signed on the air on January 28, 1994, and is a member of NPR, APM, PRI and BBC. Its studio is located on the campus of the University of Guam in Mangilao, Guam.

External links 
 
 Radio Locator
 
 
 
 

PRG
NPR member stations
Radio stations established in 1994
1994 establishments in Guam
Hagåtña, Guam
Public broadcasting in insular areas of the United States